The Walking Artists Network (WAN) is an international network dedicated to walking as a critical and artistic practice; it reflects the growth and increased interest in walking art. It is based at the University of East London's Centre for Performing Arts Development and contains a network of over 600 members from across the globe, though predominantly based in the United Kingdom. The network maintains an active email discussion community through JISCmail.

Founding 
WAN originated in late 2007 when a small group of artists in central London invited ‘all those who are interested in walking as a critical spatial practice’ to its first meeting. It was further developed when Clare Qualmann and Mark Hunter successfully bid for Arts and Humanities Research Council funding in 2011. This facilitated the international development of the network and allowed it to expand membership, develop a website and fund the Footwork research group.:80

Activities 
The Walking Artists Network is works 'on the basis of events that having walking at their core (rather than arranging things at which people sit and listen to talking about walking)'.:80 This has resulted in 'a variety of walking based initiatives' that bring 'people together to walk'.:80

Step by Step (2014-2017) 
An interdisciplinary seminar series at the University of East London, organized by Clare Qualmann and Blake Morris, that brought together artists and academics whose work engaged with the practice of walking.:80 Notable speakers included Kubra Khademi, Anna Minton and Sara Wookey.

Walking Encyclopaedia (2014) 
In 2014 the Walking Artists Network collaborated with Airspace Gallery in Stoke-on-Trent, to produce The Walking Encyclopaedia (2014) a gallery exhibition and online archive of walking practices that includes more than 150 walking practitioners and artworks.

Ways to Wander (2015) 
In 2015, a collection of walk suggestions, experiences, techniques and case studies by members of the Walking Artists' Network was published by Triarchy Press with the title Ways to Wander. The book was an 'output of the AHRC funded 'Footwork' project, and edited by Qualmann and Claire Hind.

WALKING WOMEN (2016) 
In 2016 Qualmann and Amy Sharrocks curated WALKING WOMEN, 'a series of walks talks and workshops  that featured  over forty women artists working with walking in a variety of media.':80 The event featured two programmes of work at Somerset House, London and Forest Fringe, Edinburgh.

Artists presenting their work included Jennie Savage, Sharrocks, Deirdre Heddon, Kubra Khademi, Louise Ann Wilson, Rosana Cade, The Walking Reading Group on Participation, Monique Besten and Alison Lloyd. The Live Art Development Agency published a guide to WALKING WOMEN following the events. A radio programme featuring artists involved in the programme was broadcast on Resonance FM in July 2016.

Further reading 
Hind, Claire and Clare Qualmann. Ways to Wander: 54 intriguing ideas for different ways to take a walk. Axminster: Triarchy Press, 2015.

Morris, Blake. Walking Networks: The Development of an Artistic Medium. London: Rowman and Littlefield International, 2020.

Smith, Phil. Walking's New Movement. Axminster: Triarchy Press, 2015.

References

External links 
 Walking Artists Network website
Step by Step Seminar Series
Walking Encyclopaedia
Forest Fringe
Ways to Wander
Walking Artists Network JISCMail

Interactive art
Walking art